Excoecaria cuspidata is a species of flowering plant in the family Euphorbiaceae. It was originally described as Excoecaria hialayensis var. cuspidata Müll.Arg. It is native to China and Meghalaya, India.

References

cuspidata
Flora of China
Flora of Meghalaya